The following is a list of some notable Old Oratorians, being former pupils of The Oratory School in the United Kingdom.

Literature
Hilaire Belloc, writer and historian.

Christopher Tolkien, J. R. R. Tolkien's son.
Michael Tolkien, J. R. R. Tolkien's son.
Gregory Woods, poet.

Politics
Francis Nicholas Blundell, conservative politician.
Edmund FitzAlan-Howard, conservative politician.
Peter Hope, diplomat.
James Fitzalan Hope, 1st Baron Rankeillour, conservative politician.
Arthur Oswald James Hope, 2nd Baron Rankeillour, Soldier and Conservative politician.
Igor Judge, Lord Chief Justice of England and Wales.
Edward Leigh, conservative politician.
Pierse Loftus, conservative politician.
Charles James Mathew, labour politician.
Jack Miller, United States Senator.
Edward Sheil, nationalist politician.

Military
Sir Adrian Carton de Wiart, Lieutenant General and Victoria Cross holder.
Rudolph Feilding, Viscount Feilding, Lieutenant-Colonel.
George Henry Morris, Lieutenant-Colonel.
Edward Noel, Lieutenant-Colonel.
Sir Edmund Paston Bedingfeld, 9th Baronet.
Cecil Pereira, army officer.
Edmund Tempest, pilot.

Royalty & nobility
Afonso de Santa Maria, Prince of Beira.
Sir Richard Crichton Mitchell Cotts, 4th baronet.
William Feilding, 10th Earl of Denbigh.
Bernard Fitzalan-Howard, 3rd Baron Howard of Glossop.
Bernard Fitzalan-Howard, 16th Duke of Norfolk.
Henry Fitzalan-Howard, 15th Duke of Norfolk.

Philip Kerr, 11th Marquess of Lothian.
Sir Humphrey de Trafford, 4th Baronet.

Business
Ed Conway, first economics editor of Sky News.
George M. von Furstenberg, economist.

Sport
Robert Berkeley, cricket player.
John Pius Boland, tennis player and Olympic gold medal winner.
Danny Cipriani, rugby union player.
Stewart Davison, cricket player.
Hubert Eaton, cricket player.
Ayoola Erinle, rugby union player.
Benny Howell, cricket player.
George Macnamara, Irish cricket player.
Tim Male, Olympic rower.
Alex Pearce, football player.
Michael Roberts, cricket player.
Steve Tomlinson, rugby union player.
Andy Vilk rugby union player.
Tim Atkins, hockey player.

Arts and entertainment
Jonathan Bailey, actor.

Michael Berkeley, composer.
Niccolo d'Ardia Caracciolo, painter.
Gervase Elwes, tenor.
Simon Elwes, painter.
Arthur Hervey, composer.
Steven Sykes,artist

In fiction
George Balfour, one of the main characters in the play Posh and later film adaptation The Riot Club.

Other
Charles John Philip Cave, meteorologist.
Michael Levey, historian.
Theobald Mathew, lawyer.
George Pereira, explorer.
Edward Pereira, priest.
Tom Sandars, television and radio presenter.
John Hungerford Pollen, English Jesuit, known as a historian of the Protestant Reformation.
Arthur Joseph Hungerford Pollen, English journalist, businessman.

References

 
Oratorians